First Light may refer to:

Science and technology
 First light (astronomy), the first observation with a newly commissioned telescope
 First light (cosmology), the light emitted from the first generation of stars, known as population III stars
 Nautical dawn, the time before sunrise when the sky begins to brighten
 First Light Fusion, a company developing a nuclear fusion reactor

Arts and entertainment

Literature 
 First Light (Ganguly novel), by Sunil Gangopadhyay
 First Light (Preston book), a 1987 nonfiction book on astronomy by Richard Preston
 First Light (Stead novel), a 2007 science fiction novel for children by Rebecca Stead
 First Light (Wellum book), a 2002 memoir by Geoffrey Wellum
 First Light, a 1987 novel by Charles Baxter
 First Light, a 1989 novel by Peter Ackroyd

Music 
 First Light (band), an English funk project of Paul Hardcastle
 First Light: An Oratorio, a 2005 composition by Sally Lutyens

Albums
 First Light (Easy Star All-Stars album) or the title song, 2011
 First Light (The Enid album), 2014
 First Light (Family of Mann album), 1974
 First Light (Freddie Hubbard album) or the title song, 1971
 First Light (Richard and Linda Thompson album) or the title song, 1978
 First Light (Wishbone Ash album), 2007

Songs
 "First Light", by Converge from You Fail Me, 2004
 "First Light", by Harold Budd and Brian Eno from Ambient 2: The Plateaux of Mirror, 1980
 "First Light", by Moonspell from Night Eternal, 2008
 "First Light", by Paradise Lost from Faith Divides Us – Death Unites Us, 2009
 "First Light", by Shadow Gallery from Legacy, 2001
 "First Light", by Starset from Transmissions, 2014

Other media
 "First Light" (Cloak & Dagger), a television episode
 First Light (film), a 2015 Italian film directed by Vincenzo Marra
 First Light (radio program), an American syndicated talk program hosted by Michael Toscano
 Infamous First Light, a 2014 expansion to the video game Infamous Second Son

fr:Première lumière